The Indian giant flying squirrel (Petaurista philippensis), also called the large brown flying squirrel or the common giant flying squirrel, is a species of rodent in the family Sciuridae. It is capable of gliding flight using a skin membrane stretched between front and hind legs. It is found in mainland Southeast and South Asia, and southern and central China.

Description

This is a large species, with a head and body length of about 43 cm and a tail of 50–52 cm. It has black to gray-brown fur, long and soft on the upper parts and somewhat shorter underneath the body, with a grizzled appearance. A wing membrane between the forelimb and hindlimb, paler coloured underneath, allows gliding between trees. The tail is hairy and blackish to gray-brown, the feet are black, and the nose is pale pink with black vibrissae.

Taxonomy 
Its taxonomy is very complex and not fully resolved. Up until the 1980s, some authorities even listed the Indian giant flying squirrel itself as a subspecies of the red giant flying squirrel (P. petaurista). In 2005, Mammal Species of the World included grandis, yunanensis, hainana, nigra, rubicundus and rufipes (last four as synonyms of yunanensis) in the Indian giant flying squirrel. Later studies have confirmed that all these are distinct and not closely related to the Indian giant flying squirrel; placing them together would result in a strongly polyphyletic "species". As a consequence, recent authorities have generally recognized them as part of the red giant flying squirrel or as their own species; the Formosan giant flying squirrel (P. grandis) of Taiwan, Hainan giant flying squirrel (P. hainana) of Hainan, and Yunnan giant flying squirrel (P. yunanensis) in northeastern India, south-central China, Myanmar, northern Laos and northern Vietnam (the extent of its range in the last three countries is labelled with considerable uncertainty). The Formosan and Hainan giant flying squirrels have fully separate ranges, but the Yunnan giant flying squirrel is sympatric with the Indian giant flying squirrel.

Distribution, habitat and taxonomy

The species is native to China, India, Laos, Myanmar, Sri Lanka, Taiwan, Thailand, and Vietnam.

Ecology
The Indian giant flying squirrel is nocturnal and arboreal, spending most of its life in the canopy. Nests are made in tree hollows lined with bark, fur, moss, and leaves. The species is sociable when food is abundant, but intraspecies attacks increase with food scarcity. Vocalizations are similar to those of the spot-bellied eagle-owl.

Diet
The species is mainly frugivorous, preferring the fruits of Ficus racemosa, followed by Cullenia and Artocarpus heterophyllus. It also takes bark, tree resins, shoots, leaves (particularly of F. racemosa), insects, and larvae. Squirrels were shown to be somewhat tolerant of disturbance when foraging, and to exploit food resources at the forest edge, including exotic planted species.

Reproduction
Female gives birth to a single offspring during mid June. Pups born blind, with a head that is disproportionately large when compared with the body.

See also
 Indian giant squirrel

References

Further reading
 
 
 

Petaurista
Mammals of Sri Lanka
Rodents of China
Rodents of India
Rodents of Indonesia
Rodents of Myanmar
Mammals of Taiwan
Rodents of Thailand
Fauna of Southeast Asia
Mammals described in 1839
Taxonomy articles created by Polbot